Diphasiastrum × issleri, known as Issler's clubmoss, is a hybrid species of clubmoss known from northern Europe and a few historical collections in northern Maine.

Taxonomy
Diphasiastrum × issleri is a hybrid between D. alpinum and D. complanatum. Originally placed in a broadly circumscribed Lycopodium as a race of L. alpinum, it was transferred to the segregate genus Diphasiastrum and raised to species level by Holub in 1975. In the past, it has been treated as a subspecies of D. complanatum. American material was once believed to be a hybrid between D. alpinum and D. tristachyum, but the offspring of those parents is properly known as D. × oellgaardii, which has not yet been found in North America.

References

issleri
Flora of Maine
Flora of Europe
Hybrid plants
Flora without expected TNC conservation status